Honeyman House may refer to any of three houses in Portland, Oregon, that are listed on the U.S. National Register of Historic Places:

 David T. and Nan Wood Honeyman House
 John S. Honeyman House
 Walter B. and Myrtle E. Honeyman House, a National Register listing in Northwest Portland